Neuse is an unincorporated community in Neuse Township, Wake County, North Carolina, United States. Located on the Neuse River, it is approximately nine miles north-northeast of downtown Raleigh.

External links
  

Unincorporated communities in Wake County, North Carolina
Unincorporated communities in North Carolina